Magne is a Norwegian masculine given name of Norse origin, meaning "mighty" or "fierce warrior". In Norse mythology, Magni was the son of Thor. People with the name include:  

 Magne Aarøen (1944 - 2003), Norwegian politician 
 Magne Furuholmen (born November 1, 1962, Oslo), is best known as the guitarist/keyboardist in a-ha
 Magne Havnå(1963 – 2004), Norwegian professional boxer 
 Magne Hoseth (born 1980), Norwegian footballer 
 Magne Johansen (born 1965), Norwegian ski jumper 
 Magne Lerheim (1929 - 1994), Norwegian politician 
 Magne Lystad (1932 - 1999), Norwegian orienteer
 Magne Myrmo (born 1943), Norwegian cross-country skier 
 Magne Skodvin (1915 - 2004), Norwegian historian
 Magne Sturød (born 1979), Norwegian footballer 
 Magne Thomassen (born 1941), Norwegian speed skater

References

See also
 Magne (surname)

Masculine given names
Norwegian masculine given names